The 1857 Grand National was the 19th renewal of the Grand National horse race that took place at Aintree near Liverpool, England, on 4 March 1857.

Finishing Order

Non-finishers

References

 1857
Grand National
Grand National
19th century in Lancashire
March 1857 sports events